Léonie Guyer (born January 1, 1955 in New York City) is a contemporary artist known for abstract paintings, drawings and installations utilizing materials such as antique, vintage and handmade paper, marble remnants (or fragments), wood panels, and in site-based projects, walls and windows.

Early life and education
Guyer was born in 1955 in New York City. She received her B.F.A. and M.F.A. from the San Francisco Art Institute.

Work
Guyer makes paintings, drawings, site-based work, and artist books.

Stephanie Snyder describes Léonie Guyer’s work as the following:  

“The richly layered, albescent grounds of Léonie Guyer’s most recent paintings are inspired, in part, by the creamy surfaces of ancient Greek white-ground vessels, by the work of painters such as Piet Mondrian (1872–1944) and Giorgio Morandi (1890–1964), and by natural materials such as milk, bone, and chalk. Guyer mixes her paints by hand from raw pigments, often restricting her palette to the “ancient” primary colors (iron oxides, yellow ochres, and mineral-based blues), in addition to various blacks and whites. This alchemical chromaticism allows Guyer to experience the physical and energetic properties of each material as directly and as sensitively as possible. Hand-mixing paint is an intimate, timeconsuming, and repetitive activity, resulting in modest batches that settle and cohere in accordance with the subtle variations of each particular admixture of pigment, linseed oil, and mineral spirit. No two batches are the same, recalling the ancient philosopher Heraclitus of Ephesus’s observation that “You cannot step twice into the same river.” At the core of Guyer’s paintings and drawings is an awareness and embrace of life as a vulnerable and temporary moment within a measureless, universal continuum.”

In his exhibition text, Anthony Huberman, the Director and Chief Curator of CCA Wattis Institute, writes:

“Léonie Guyer makes paintings and drawings. They consist mostly of abstract shapes, usually modest in scale, made with oil paint or pencil. In her mind, an artwork is a place where countless decisions are condensed and compacted together, and she works to intensify that concentration by keeping her paintings small and reduced down to their bare essentials: color, surface, and shape. She tries to do the most with the least. And yet to call her works “small” is misleading. Better would be to say that she makes “immeasurable” works of art, which doesn’t mean that they are epic in scale but simply that they are not meant to be measured.”

Awards and fellowships 
Léonie Guyer received the following awards in her artistic career: Tosa Studio Award: Finalist Award (2018), Foundation for Contemporary Arts Emergency Grant (2012), Sites ReSeen Grant, New York State Council on the Arts (2006), Fellowship, John Anson Kittredge Foundation (2002), Artist in Residence Grant, California Arts Council (1997, 1996, 1995), Murphy and Cadogan, Fellowship in the Fine Arts, San Francisco Foundation (1987)

Selected exhibitions
Guyer has had solo exhibits at Wattis Institute for Contemporary Arts, SF; odium fati, SF; Greg Kucera Gallery, Seattle; Lumber Room, Portland; and The Shaker Museum, Mt. Lebanon, NY and other venues.

Other exhibitions include  shows at UC Berkeley Art Museum and Pacific Film Archive, Feature Inc., NYC, Peter Blum Gallery, NYC, Greg Kucera Gallery, Seattle, Lumber Room, Portland, OR, Douglas F. Cooley Memorial Art Gallery, Reed College, Portland, OR, Gallery Joe, Philadelphia, PLUSkunst, Düsseldorf, Germany and other venues.

Collections
Guyer's work is held in many permanent collections including: The Metropolitan Museum of Art, Columbia University Rare Book & Manuscript Library, Harvard University Modern Books & Manuscripts Collection, Reed College Art Collection, San Francisco Museum of Modern Art, Shaker Museum and Library, Stanford University Special Collections, UC Berkeley Art Museum and Pacific Film Archive, Yale University Beinecke Rare Book & Manuscript Library.

Collaborative projects 
Bill Berkson (poetry) and Léonie Guyer (drawings). Not an Exit. Fairfax, CA: Jungle Garden Press, 2010

Franck André Jamme (poetry) and Léonie Guyer (drawings). Mantra Box. Paris, France: Festina Lente, 2009

Teaching
Guyer has taught at the San Francisco Art Institute, California College of the Arts, UC Berkeley, San José State University and elsewhere. She lives and works in San Francisco.

References

External links

1955 births
Living people
American women installation artists
American installation artists
Artists from New York City
San Francisco Art Institute alumni
20th-century American artists
20th-century American women artists
21st-century American artists
21st-century American women artists
San Francisco Art Institute faculty
California College of the Arts faculty
University of California, Berkeley faculty
San Jose State University faculty
Artists from San Francisco
American women academics